Sar Galu-ye Sar Asiab (also Romanized as Sar Galū-ye Sar Āsīāb; also known as Sar Galū’īyeh and Sar Kalū) is a village in Rezvan Rural District, Jebalbarez District, Jiroft County, Kerman Province, Iran. At the 2006 census, its population was 60, in 11 families.

References 

Populated places in Jiroft County